Ōtani, Otani, Ohtani or Ootani is a Japanese surname. Notable people with the surname include:

, Japanese baseball player
, Japanese footballer
, Japanese voice actress
), Japanese general
, Japanese composer
, Japanese Buddhist monk and explorer
, Japanese military officer
, Japanese volleyball player
, Japanese architect
, Japanese professional wrestler
, Japanese composer
, Japanese samurai and daimyō

See also
Tani (surname)

Japanese-language surnames